Gerald Denoird (August 4, 1902 – October 8, 1989) was a Canadian  hockey player who played one season in the National Hockey League for the Toronto St. Pats, playing 17 games.

Playing career
Denoird played junior hockey for Toronto Aura Lee between 1920 and 1922. He turned professional in 1922 and played 17 games during the 1922–23 NHL season with the Toronto St. Pats of the National Hockey League, scoring one assist. He is not recorded playing in the 1923–24 season, but for 1924–25 he joined the senior Toronto Aura Lee team for two games, and also played for the Toronto AA Clarke club that year.

Career statistics

Regular season and playoffs

External links

1902 births
1989 deaths
Canadian ice hockey centres
Ontario Hockey Association Senior A League (1890–1979) players
Ice hockey people from Toronto
Toronto St. Pats players